Vellakinar is one of the localities of the Coimbatore city in Tamil Nadu, India. Vellakinar is located on the stretch of Mettupalayam road in Coimbatore. Neighbourhing places of Vellakinar are Thudiyalur, Goundampalayam, GN Mills(Gnanambikai Mills). Tamil Nadu Housing Board colony, Sreevatsa Gardens, Samathuvapuram and Meenakshi Gardens, Coimbatore are main residential areas in Vellakinar panchayat. Vellakinar was added to the Coimbatore municipal corporation.

Demographics
As of the 2001 India census, Vellakinar had a population of 9609. Males constitute 51% of the population and females 49%. Vellakinar has an average literacy rate of 72%, higher than the national average of 59.5%: male literacy is 77%, and female literacy is 67%. In Vellakinar, 9% of the population is under 6 years of age.

Vellakinar South Solai Pond

Vellakinar South Solai Pond is around 6.5 acres, which is not maintained properly and not filled with water.

References

Cities and towns in Coimbatore district
Suburbs of Coimbatore